Qayfah Al Mahdi is a sub-district located in Wald Rabi' District, Al Bayda Governorate, Yemen.  Qayfah Al Mahdi had a population of 19427  according to the 2004 census.

References 

Sub-districts in Wald Rabi' District